Adam Loftus (c. 1533 – 5 April 1605) was Archbishop of Armagh, and later Dublin, and Lord Chancellor of Ireland from 1581. He was also the first Provost of Trinity College Dublin.

Early life
Adam Loftus was born in 1533, the second son of Edward Loftus, bailiff of Swineside in Coverdale, one of the Yorkshire Dales, for Coverham Abbey. Edward died when Loftus was only eight years old, leaving his estates to his elder brother Robert Loftus. Edward Loftus had made his living through the Catholic Church, but the son embraced the Protestant faith early in his development. He was an undergraduate at Trinity College, Cambridge, where he reportedly attracted the notice of the young Queen Elizabeth, as much by his physique as through the power of his intellect, having shone before her in oratory. This encounter may never have happened, but Loftus certainly met with the Queen more than once, and she became his patron for the rest of her reign. At Cambridge Loftus took holy orders as a Catholic priest and was appointed rector of Outwell St Clement in Norfolk. He came to the attention of the Catholic Queen Mary (1553–58), who named him vicar of Gedney, Lincolnshire. On Elizabeth's accession in 1558, he declared himself Anglican.

Ireland
Loftus made the acquaintance of the Queen's favourite Thomas Radclyffe, 3rd Earl of Sussex and served as his chaplain in Ireland in 1560. In 1561 he became chaplain to Alexander Craike, Bishop of Kildare and Dean of St Patrick's in Dublin. Later that year he was appointed Rector of Painstown, County Meath, and evidently earned a reputation as a learned and discreet advisor to the English authorities in Dublin. In 1563, he was consecrated archbishop of Armagh at the unprecedented age of 30 by Hugh Curwen, Archbishop of Dublin.

Following a clash with Shane O'Neill, Chief of the Name of Clan O'Neill, Lord of Tír Eoghain, and the real power in Ulster during these years, Loftus moved his residence to Dublin in 1564. To supplement the meagre income of his troubled archbishopric he was temporarily appointed to the Deanery of St Patrick's by the queen in the following year, "in lieu of better times ahead". He was also appointed president of the new commission for ecclesiastical causes. This led to a serious quarrel with the highly respected Bishop of Meath, Hugh Brady. 

In 1567 Loftus, having lobbied successfully for the removal of Hugh Curwen, who became Bishop of Oxford, and having defeated the rival claims of the Bishop of Meath, was appointed Archbishop of Dublin, where the queen expected him to carry out reforms in the Church. On several occasions, he temporarily carried out the functions of Lord Keeper, and in August 1581 he was appointed Lord Chancellor of Ireland after an involved dispute with Nicholas White, Master of the Rolls in Ireland. Loftus was constantly occupied in attempts to improve his financial position by obtaining additional preferment (he had been obliged to resign the Deanery of St Patrick's in 1567), and was subject to repeated accusations of corruption in public office.

In 1582 Loftus acquired land and built a castle at Rathfarnham, which he inhabited from 1585 (and which has been recently restored to public view).

Reformation
In 1569–1570 the divisions in Irish politics took on a religious tinge with the First Desmond Rebellion in Munster and Pope Pius V's 1570 papal bull Regnans in Excelsis. The bull sentenced Queen Elizabeth to excommunication and deposition for both heresy and the religious persecution of the Catholics under her rule. Thereafter, to a much greater extent than before, all Roman Catholics, even those who were completely apolitical, were regarded as traitors by the Queen and her officials.

Between 1583 and 1584, Archbishop Loftus took a leading part in the arrest, torture, and execution of Dermot O'Hurley, the Roman Catholic Archbishop of Cashel. Even though Archbishop O'Hurley revealed that he was not involved in anything except his religious mission and that he had refused to carry letters from the Cardinal Protector of Ireland to the leaders of the Second Desmond Rebellion, Sir Francis Walsingham suggested he should be tortured. Loftus replied to Walsingham: "Not finding that easy method of examination do any good, we made command to Mr Waterhouse and Mr Secretary Fenton to put him to the torture, such as your honour advised us, which was to toast his feet against the fire with hot boots". Although the Irish judges repeatedly decided that there was no case against O'Hurley, on 19 June 1584 Loftus and Sir Henry Wallop wrote to Walsingham "We gave warrant to the knight-marshal to do execution upon him, which accordingly was performed, and thereby the realm rid of a most pestilent member".

Much has been written about Loftus during this time but between 1584 and 1591; he had a series of clashes with Sir John Perrot on the location of an Irish University. Perrot wanted to use St Patrick's Cathedral, Dublin as the site of the new University, which Loftus sought to preserve as the principal place of Protestant worship in Dublin (as well as a valuable source of income for himself). The Archbishop won the argument with the help of his patron, Queen Elizabeth I, and Trinity College Dublin was founded at its current location, named after his old college at Cambridge, leaving the Cathedral unaffected. Loftus was named as its first Provost in 1593.

The issue of religious and political rivalry continued during the two Desmond Rebellions (1569–83) and the Nine Years' War (1594–1603), both of which overlapped with the Anglo-Spanish War (1585–1604), during which some rebellious members of the Gaelic nobility of Ireland were covertly aided by the Papacy and by Elizabeth's arch-enemy King Philip II of Spain. Due to the unsettled state of the country, Protestantism made little progress in English-speaking or Gaelic Ireland, in direct contrast to the similarly Celtic-language-speaking people of Scotland, the Isle of Man, and Wales. Protestantism came to be associated with military conquest and was intensely hated by many. The political-religious overlap was personified by Adam Loftus, who served as Archbishop and as Lord Chancellor of Ireland. An unlikely alliance accordingly formed between Gaelic Irish families and the Hiberno-Norman "Old English", who had been mortal enemies for centuries but who now mostly remained Roman Catholic.

Family
Around 1560 Adam was quietly married to Jane (c. 1540–1595), the daughter of James Purdon (1516-1595) and his wife Jane Little, daughter of Thomas Little of Thornhill, Cumberland and Margaret Graham.  The Purdons settled in Ireland and became substantial landowners in County Clare and County Cork, and were particularly associated with Ballyclogh,  County Cork.

Adam and Jane Loftus were the parents of twenty children, eight of whom died in infancy. The twelve who grew to adulthood were:
 Sir Dudley Loftus, married Anne Bagenal (grandparents of Dudley Loftus, a pioneer scholar of Middle Eastern languages);
 Sir Edward Loftus (died 1601), Recorder of Dublin, killed at the Siege of Kinsale;  married Anne Duke, no surviving issue;
 Adam Loftus, unmarried, killed in battle;
 Sir Thomas Loftus, married Ellen Hartpole;
 Henry Loftus, Thomas' twin, died in his teens;
 Isabella Loftus (also found as 'Isabel'), married (as his 1st wife) Sir William Ussher, son of John Ussher, Alderman of Dublin and his wife Ales (or Alison), daughter of Sir William Newman,   Knight, Mayor of Dublin;
 Anne Loftus, married (i) Sir Henry Colley of Carbury; (ii) George Blount; and (iii) Edward Blayney, 1st Baron Blayney; she and Henry were ancestors of the Duke of Wellington;
 Catherine Loftus, who married Sir Francis Berkeley and then Henry Berkeley;
 Martha Loftus, who married Sir Thomas Colclough of Tintern Abbey, County Wexford;
 Dorothy Loftus, married Sir John Moore of Croghan;
 Alice Loftus, married Sir Henry Warren of Warrenstown; and
 Margaret Loftus, married Sir George Colley of Edenderry

Death
Loftus died in Dublin in 1605 and was interred in the building he had helped to preserve for future generations, while many of his portraits hang today within the walls of the University which he helped found. Having buried his wife Jane (Purdon) and two sons (of their 20 children) in the family vault at St. Patrick's, Adam Loftus died at his Episcopal Palace in Kevin Street "worn out with age" and joined his family in the same vault. Loftus' zeal and efficiency were commended by James I upon the king's accession.

Personality
Elrington Ball describes him as the dominant judicial figure in Elizabethan Ireland, who through his exceptional strength of personality towered above all his contemporaries.

References

Other
Francis Elrington Ball (1902): A History of the County of Dublin – Dublin: Greene's Bookshop; the HSP Library – Ir 94133 1: 6 volumes
Francis Elrington Ball, (1926): The Judges of Ireland 1221–1921 – London: John Murray pp. 214–217; 326–328

Luce JV, 1992: Trinity College Dublin, the first 400 years –
Prestwick J, 1783: Origin and Etymology of the Loftus Family – attributed to a Herald's manuscript
James Ware, 1739: The Whole Works of Sir James Ware concerning Ireland, revised & improved – Vol I p. 94–95, 1739

1530s births
1605 deaths
Alumni of Trinity College, Cambridge
Anglican archbishops of Dublin
Anti-Catholicism in Ireland
Deans of St. Patrick's Cathedral, Dublin
Adam
Lord chancellors of Ireland
Clergy from Yorkshire
16th-century Anglo-Irish people
Priest hunters
Provosts of Trinity College Dublin
16th-century Anglican bishops in Ireland
17th-century Anglican archbishops
17th-century Anglican bishops in Ireland
Anglican archbishops of Armagh
British expatriate archbishops
People from Coverdale